Huechulafquen Lake is a lake in Neuquén Province, Patagonian Argentina. This glacial lake is located in the Andean mountains in Lanín National Park some 25 kilometres from Junín de los Andes and 60 kilometres from San Martín de los Andes. It is one of Argentina's largest Andean lakes and is fed by glaciers and meltwater streams and lakes.

Description
 
Lakes Paimún and Epulafquén are connected to the main body of the lake by short, narrow, shallow straits, but are usually considered separate lakes. The Chimehuin River flows south-eastward out of the lake with its ultimate destination the Atlantic Ocean. Junin de los Andes is the nearest city.

Lake Paimun is fed by glaciers originating on Lanin volcano and by small streams that originate at the border with Chile.

A complex of volcanoes, the Huanquihue Group,  in elevation, rise above its southern shore. About 1800 CE, a lava flow from one of the volcanic cones reached the southern shore of the lake causing a rocky, distorted delta. Hot springs and thermal baths are located near the shores of this lake.

Most of the precipitation falls in the southern hemisphere winter.

Tourism

Lake Huechulafquen is a popular tourist destination for camping, hiking, boating, climbing Lanin volcano, and fishing for rainbow and brown trout, species introduced to Argentine in the early 1900s.  A road runs along the north shore of the lake, passing through several communities of the Mapuche people, who live within the boundaries of Lanin National Park. Another road touches along the southern shoreline of Lake Epulaufquén providing access to the volcanic flows there.  This road continues westward, crossing into Chile at the Carirriñe Pass, elevation .

References

Lakes of Neuquén Province
Glacial lakes of Argentina